Maja e Hekurave is a mountain in the Bjeshkët e Namuna mountain range in northern Albania. At , it is one of the highest peaks in the mountain range. Maja Hekurave is a popular tourist spot.

Mountains of Albania
Accursed Mountains